Following the social upheavals of the 1960s, San Francisco became one of the centers of progressive activism, with Democrats, and progressives dominating city politics. This continuing trend is also visible in the results of presidential elections; the last Republican to win San Francisco was Dwight Eisenhower in 1956. Although the fight between Democrats and Republicans has been unequal for the last forty years, it has become increasingly lopsided, with conservative commentators frequently attacking the city's politics using the ad hominem phrase, "San Francisco values". In spite of its heavy liberal leanings, San Francisco has the highest percentage of "no party preference" voters of any California county, as of November, 2012. Campaign corruption is monitored by the San Francisco Ethics Commission and violations result in fines up to $5,000 per violation.

State and federal representation 

In the United States House of Representatives, San Francisco is split between two congressional districts. Pelosi served as the House Speaker from January 3, 2019 to January 3, 2023, a post she also held from 2007 through 2011. She has also held the post of House Minority Leader, from 2003 to 2007 and 2011 to 2019.

Local politics 
The city is governed by a mayor and an 11-member Board of Supervisors, both elected using preferential voting. The current mayor is London Breed.

Housing 
Housing is a frequent topic in San Francisco politics.

San Francisco has the highest housing prices in the United States. As of 2018, its median house price was $1.61 million, almost twice the average from five years earlier. Many factors contribute to the housing situation in San Francisco. One of the main reasons for this is the lack of available homes to live in. The Bay Area, from 2011 to 2015, only created 1 home for every 8 jobs created.

San Francisco has some of the most stringent housing laws in the United States. It ranks 3rd among cities in the United States as the hardest city to build in.

It has been estimated by San Francisco's chief economist that in order for prices in San Francisco to stabilize, the city would need around 100,000 units to reduce prices.

Voter registration statistics, 2013

Voter participation statistics 

Total Registration and Turnout
November 6, 2018
Registration 500,516
Turnout 345,806
June 5, 2018
Registration 481,991
Turnout 253,583
November 8, 2016
Registration 513,573
Turnout 414,528
 June 7, 2016
Registration 468,238
Turnout 264,993
November 3, 2015
Registration 446,828
Turnout 203,069
November 4, 2014
Registration 436,019
Turnout 231,214
June 3, 2014
Registration 435,757
Turnout 129,399
November 5, 2013
Registration 440,037
Turnout 128,937
November 6, 2012
Registration 502,841
Turnout 364,875
June 5, 2012
Registration 470,668
Turnout 145105

See also 
Gerald Ford assassination attempt in San Francisco

Notes

References

Further reading

External links
 https://sfelections.sfgov.org/